Muscat Daily is an Omani newspaper that was founded in 2009. The print edition of Muscat Daily is the largest-selling English daily in Oman with nearly 33,500 copies sold every day on Omani weekdays (Sunday to Thursday) . Apex Media includes it's free weekly newspaper 'theweek' free to Muscat Daily subscribers each Thursday as their weekend edition. Muscat Daily is owned by Apex Media, a leading Omani publishing company, established for nearly 40 years. Other publications in the Apex Media stable include the annual, Business Directory and Tribute. Apex also does occasional projects such as the Map of Oman, Apex Map of Muscat, The Sultan Qaboos Grand Mosque coffee table book etc. Apex Media was founded in 1980 by Omani businessman Saleh Zakwani, who is also the current Executive Chairman of the company.

The newspaper celebrated its first anniversary on October 13. Muscat Daily is accessible online at muscatdaily.com.

Content

Editorial content is generated by an in-house team of reporters and writers in the case of Oman news. International news is sourced from a variety of newswires including The New York Times Syndicate and News Service, BBC, dpa, TMS Features, IANS, Asian News Network. The paper runs crosswords provided by The Guardian.

Sections
The newspaper is organized in two sections. Section 1 is the main section with 12 pages containing Oman (National) news, Regional and World news, Op-Ed and Sports.
Section 2 is 8 pages, and carries Business news, Crosswords, Sudoku puzzles, quiz questions and a Features section.
On Wednesdays, TheWeek newspaper is delivered free to Muscat Daily subscribers as weekend reading.

Design and style
The newspaper which features a bright tulip orange and black theme in a seven column format. The design has received favorable reviews at design workshops run by WAN-IFRA the biggest association of publishers in the world. Muscat Daily is 
printed at the company's own printing centre on the outskirts of Muscat and also carries out contract printing operations.

In February 2010, parent company, then Apex Press and Publishing, announced that they had signed an agreement to purchase a Goss Community SSC Press with a rated speed of 35,000 copies per hour from the American printing press manufacturer.

Despite the relative young age of the newspaper, the circulation quickly picked up and the paper went on to become the largest selling English-language daily in the Sultanate of Oman by mid-2010. The main reason quoted by industry analysts for this was the low annual subscription fees of the newspaper in a market which traditionally had fewer than 1,000 residential subscribers for English dailies before the entry of Muscat Daily. An annual subscription to Muscat Daily cost OMR 50 (about $130) compared to the OMR 72 ($186) of competitors likes Times of Oman, Oman Tribune and Oman Daily Observer.

Political persuasion overall
Muscat Daily has been described by analysts as having a centrist liberal bias on most issues. Overall, the stated mission of the paper and its management is to report and not sensationalise or editorialise matters.

Other controversies
Muscat Daily has been criticized as being a late entry into the newspaper arena in Oman at a time when newspaper subscriptions are falling in the West. In a scathing critique, Eliott Beer posted on AdNation Middle East's website, "Apparently no-one's told the guys in Oman about the demise of traditional print media (it's dead, you know) - some publisher's only gone and started up another newspaper."

However, parent company Apex Media says that newspaper circulations are increasing in emerging markets and since the penetration of broadband in Oman is still only about 12%  of the total population, it does not see any threat to its print business. Muscat Daily was launched as a direct competitor to other English language dailies in Oman including the Times of Oman, Oman Tribune and the government-run Oman Daily Observer.

Muscat Daily in international media
The role that Muscat Daily has played in pushing the boundaries of media freedom and censorship in 'the sleepy sultanate' has been recognized by world media, particularly those that work in markets where media freedom is guaranteed. An article in Christian Science Monitor on the protests and media freedom in Oman said:

"The fact that Oman's first civil unrest in 40 years left at least one person dead in a northern port city here was big news. But it was even bigger news that the English-language Muscat Daily declared "Black Sunday in Sohar" on its front page and carried a half-page photograph showing smoke filling the sky above a roundabout seized by protesters."

The article was subsequently carried in other prominent newspapers and publications across the world including Gulf News, Yahoo News, MinnPost 

According to an article in The Economist in early March 2011, "Newspapers such as the Muscat Daily have begun to cover the protests in a way that would have been unthinkable even a week ago."

Among other international media, Spanish newspaper El País has quoted Muscat Daily in its coverage of the 2011 Omani protests and the related action by the government and other actors in the 2011 protests. Talking about the reforms instituted by Sultan Qaboos, in the wake of the protests it said:
"Según datos recabados por el Muscat Daily, la medida beneficia a 130.000 ciudadanos, el 73% de todos los que trabajan ese sector." (Translation: According to data compiled by Muscat Daily, the new measures will benefit about 130,000 people or about 73% of those working in the private sector.)

References 

2009 establishments in Oman
Daily newspapers published in Oman
English-language newspapers published in Arab countries
Arab mass media
Newspapers established in 2009